Tamsin Cook (born  25 December 1998) is an Australian swimmer and the former junior world champion in the 400-meter freestyle. After a neck injury in 2018 she retired from swimming, but returned in 2020 and qualified for the 2020 Summer Olympics in Tokyo.

Junior career
Cook participated in the 2014 Junior Pan Pacific Swimming Championships in Maui, Hawaii.

She won the gold medal in the 400 meter freestyle at the 2015 FINA World Junior Swimming Championships in Singapore in a new Championships record. She also broke the Championships record in the 200 meter freestyle with her lead-off leg in the  freestyle relay final. In that race she and her teammates broke the junior world record. Cook also won a silver medal in the 200 meter butterfly.

In October 2015, Cook was named Western Australian Institute of Sport's Junior Athlete of the Year. The following year, she was named WAIS Junior Athlete of the Year, for the second year defeating other young athletes including diver Nikita Hains.

Senior career
In April 2016, Cook qualified for the 2016 Summer Olympics in Rio de Janeiro in the 400-meter freestyle, which was her first Olympics. She finished 6th in the final.

After a neck injury disqualified her from the 2018 Commonwealth Games, she retired from swimming in June 2018 to focus on her university studies.

Personal life
Cook moved from South Africa to Perth, Australia when she was 8. She qualified for an academic scholarship at Perth Modern School, but left after Year 8. She was attending St Mark's Anglican Community School until year 11. Cook moved to the School of Isolated and Distance Education in year 11 to focus on her swimming.

References

External links
 
 
 
 

1998 births
Living people
Australian female freestyle swimmers
Australian female butterfly swimmers
South African emigrants to Australia
Swimmers at the 2016 Summer Olympics
Olympic swimmers of Australia
Olympic silver medalists for Australia
Medalists at the 2016 Summer Olympics
Olympic silver medalists in swimming
Swimmers at the 2020 Summer Olympics
Medalists at the 2020 Summer Olympics
20th-century Australian women
21st-century Australian women